The Socialist Party of Albania (PS or PSSh) is a social-democratic political party in Albania. It has been described as centre-left. It was founded on 13 June 1991. The PS is an associate of the Party of European Socialists and a member of the Socialist International, and holds pro-European views.

History 

The PS' predecessor, the Party of Labour of Albania (Partia e Punës së Shqipërisë - PPSH), was formed in November 1941, and has been known as the Socialist Party (Partia Socialiste - PSSH) since 1991, when it survived in the wake of the dramatic changes that had taken place in Albania since 1989. PPSH was the Albanian Communist party under its founder and longtime leader Enver Hoxha and the only ruling party in the country since the end of World War II. Hoxha's successor Ramiz Alia was forced to introduce limited reforms in the late 1980s. On 11 December 1990, Alia announced that the PPSh had given up its monopoly of power. The PPSh won the 1991 Albanian Constitutional Assembly election, the first free elections held in the country in almost 80 years. By this time, it was no longer a Marxist–Leninist party. At an extraordinary congress on 10–13 June 1991, the PPSh voted to change its name to the PS in an effort to survive in the new system.

Fatos Nano, a man from the intelligentsia, was elected the new chairman. Nano helped to reform the old Communist party and made it a member of the Socialist International. A faction of the party, led by Ilir Meta, split away from the PS in 2004 and formed the Socialist Movement for Integration (Lëvizja Socialiste për Integrim, LSI).

On 10 October 2005, Nano resigned as the chairman of the PS after losing the 2005 Albanian parliamentary election, and was succeeded by Edi Rama. Under Rama's lead, the PS formed the Alliance for a European Albania, which united several political parties. The alliance won the 2013 Albanian parliamentary election, thus returning the Socialists to the government after 8 years.

The Socialist Party, now running alone, again won the 2017 election and the 2021 election, winning 74 seats in both of them and is thus currently able to rule Albania alone, although it is externally supported by the Social Democratic Party in parliament.

Political positions 
In its 2013 party platform, the party has pledged to replace the flat tax with a progressive tax, and also supports universal health care. Party leader Edi Rama has indicated that he supports LGBT rights in Albania. The party is also pro-European, supports the accession of Albania to the European Union, NATO membership, and considers Kosovo "Albania's main strategic partner and ally".

Party leaders

Election results

Logos 
The current logo is based on the fist and rose logo in the version created by José María Cruz Novillo for the Spanish Socialist Workers Party in 1977.

See also 
 Political Academy of the Socialist Party of Albania

Notes

References

External links 
 

 
Political parties in Albania
Social democratic parties
Socialism in Albania